Anachis valledori is a species of sea snail in the family Columbellidae, the dove snails.

Description
The shell grows to a length of 8.3 mm.

Distribution
This species occurs in the Atlantic Ocean off the Cape Verdes.

References

 Rolán E., 2005. Malacological Fauna From The Cape Verde Archipelago. Part 1, Polyplacophora and Gastropoda.

External links
 

valledori
Gastropods described in 2002
Gastropods of Cape Verde